Karel Kovařovic (Prague, 9 December 1862  Prague, 6 December 1920) was a Czech composer and conductor.

Life
From 1873 to 1879 he studied clarinet, harp and piano at the Prague Conservatory. He began his career as a harpist. In 1900 Kovařovic became the conductor of the national theatre in Prague, due mostly to the success of his opera The Dogheads, after the novel of the same name (about Jan Sladký Kozina) by Alois Jirásek. His engagement at the National Theatre lasted twenty years, until 1920. He composed seven operas.

Kovařovic is most remembered today for the revisions he made to Leoš Janáček's Jenůfa for its premiere in Prague, and it was in his version that the opera was heard for many years.

A recording of The Dogheads, featuring Beno Blachut, exists.

Compositions

Orchestra 
 1880 Předehra veseloherní (Comic overture)
 1883 Únos Persefony, symphonic poem
 1887 Concerto in f mineur, for piano and orchestra, op. 6
 1892 Předehra dramatická (Dramatic overture)
 1900 Fantasie from the opera "Prodaná nevěsta" of Bedřich Smetana
 Deux suites de ballet
 Gavotta, for violin and string quartet, op. 4
 Havířská polka (Miners' polka) from play Mr Brouček's excursion to the Exhibition (1894) 
 Valčík (waltz), for chamber orchestra

Works for wind band 
 1911 Lustspiel Ouverture
 1914 Vzpomínky
 Havířská polka

Theatre

Operas

Ballet

Incidental music 
 1918 Loutkářův sirotek, melodrama – text: Svatopluk Čech "Ve stínu lípy"
 Zlatý kolovrat, melodrama – text: Karel Jaromír Erben

Vocal music

Works for choir 
 1890 Královničky; staré obřadné tance moravské se zpěvy, for women (SSAA) en piano (of harmonium)

Song 
 1880 Osmero písní, for soprano and piano, op. 1
 1885 Tři žertovné písně (Three humorous songs)
 1887 Jarní květy (Spring blossoms), for soprano and piano, op. 7
 1892–1893 Čtyři písně (Four songs), op. 18
 Der Abendstern – text:  August Heinrich Hoffmann von Fallersleben
 Gottes Nähe
 Frühlings Mahnung – text: August Heinrich Hoffmann von Fallersleben
 Im Arm der Liebe schlummre ein – text: Georg Scheurlin
 1897–1898 Dvě písně (Two songs), for soprano or tenor and piano
 1915 Slovácká píseň, for high voice and piano  – text: Ema Destinnová
 1919 Svítání (Dayspring), for voice and orchestra – text: Vojtěch Martínek

Chamber music 
 String quartet No 1 (1885)
 String quartet No 2 (1887)
 String quartet No 3 (1889)
 Romance for violin and piano, op. 2

Works for piano 
 1885 Co ti to napadá, polka
 1910 Deux valses, 
 1910 Polka 
 1910 Deux mazurkas
 Čtverylka, quadrille 
 Národní tance
 Pasačka
 Starodávný
 Holuběnka
 Naše vlast, fantasie

Notes

References

External links
Works

1862 births
1920 deaths
Czech classical composers
Czech male classical composers
Czech conductors (music)
Male conductors (music)
19th-century conductors (music)
Czech opera composers
Male opera composers
19th-century classical composers
20th-century classical composers
20th-century conductors (music)
Musicians from Prague
Prague Conservatory alumni
20th-century Czech male musicians